U.S. Route 18 (US 18) is an east–west U.S. highway in the Midwestern United States. The western terminus is in Orin, Wyoming at an interchange with Interstate 25.  Its eastern terminus is in downtown Milwaukee, Wisconsin. However, US 18 runs concurrent with other U.S. routes from its western terminus to Mule Creek Junction, Wyoming. US 18 is one of the original United States highways of 1926. The US 18 designation was originally proposed for a road in Michigan from Grand Haven east to Detroit. This roadway was eventually designated as U.S. Route 16.

Route description

Wyoming
In Wyoming, US 18 runs concurrent with U.S. Route 20 from Interstate 25 to Lusk, where US 18 branches off to run concurrently with U.S. Route 85.  At the unincorporated community of Mule Creek Junction in northeastern Niobrara County, US 18 leaves US 85.  This ten-mile (16 km) stretch from US 85 to the South Dakota border is the only segment of US 18 in Wyoming which is not co-signed with another highway. Running for nearly 100 miles, US 18 has a speed limit of 70 MPH with the exception of its ending terminus at Orin and the portion throughout Lusk.

South Dakota

U.S. 18 enters South Dakota west of Edgemont.  It passes through Hot Springs, the Pine Ridge Indian Reservation, the Rosebud Indian Reservation,  Winner, and Gregory before crossing the Missouri River near Pickstown over the Fort Randall Dam.  East of the Missouri River, U.S. 18 passes through (or near) Lake Andes and Tripp before a brief concurrency with Interstate 29 near Worthing.  East of I-29, U.S. 18 passes through Canton before crossing the Big Sioux River into Iowa.

The Oyate Trail is one of the names given (in the late 1990s) to the section of US-18 traveling across South Dakota from I-29 east of Vermillion to Maverick Junction.

Named in an attempt to encourage more tourism traffic through the lands of various AmerInd tribes in southern South Dakota, it passes through or near the Yankton Sioux Indian Reservation, the Rosebud Indian Reservation, and the Pine Ridge Indian Reservation, crossing the James River Valley, the Missouri River near Fort Randall Dam, portions of Pine Ridge, and the High Plains of South Dakota, connecting the urban areas of the middle Missouri River with the Black Hills.

Portions of the road were known as the Grant Highway, Black Hills Sioux Trail, and as part of the Omaha, Rosebud and Black Hills Highway and the Custer Battlefield Trail.

Towns along the road include Gregory, Winner, Olivet, Mission, Martin, Batesland, and Pine Ridge. Nearby towns and locales of interest include Rosebud (capital of the Rosebud Sioux Tribe), and Wounded Knee.

Legal definition
The South Dakota section of U.S. 18, other than the concurrency with Interstate 29, is defined at South Dakota Codified Laws § 31-4-141.

Iowa

U.S. 18 enters Iowa via a Big Sioux River crossing northeast of Beloit. It overlaps U.S. Route 75 for a mile near Hull and U.S. Route 59 for a mile near Sanborn. It then overlaps U.S. Route 71 through Spencer. U.S. 18 passes through Emmetsburg before intersecting U.S. Route 169 at Algona. U.S. 18 then continues east through Garner before intersecting Interstate 35 in Clear Lake. After a brief concurrency with I-35, U.S. 18 continues as a freeway bypassing Mason City to the south. At Charles City, U.S. 18 becomes a rural two-lane highway again, except for a brief concurrency with the U.S. Route 63 bypass of New Hampton.

U.S. 18 is the designated route of the Avenue of the Saints between Clear Lake and Charles City.

Wisconsin

Upon entry into Wisconsin at Prairie du Chien, US 18 is the terminus for WIS 60.  The two routes are then concurrent until Bridgeport where WIS 60 splits off to the east and US 18 crosses the Wisconsin River and turns east on the other side.  The route joins the US 151 expressway in Dodgeville and the two remain concurrent east to Madison (See U.S. Route 151 in Wisconsin for an interchange list).  US 18 follows US 12 south of Madison and passes through or around Cambridge, Jefferson and Waukesha before terminating in Milwaukee at the junction of East Michigan Street and Lincoln Memorial Drive in downtown.

Major intersections
Wyoming
  in Orin. US 18/US 20 travel concurrently to Lusk.
  in Lusk. The highways travel concurrently to the northeastern part of Niobrara County.
South Dakota
  in Hot Springs. The highways travel concurrently to Oelrichs.
  west of Mission. The highways travel concurrently to Mission.
  southeast of Witten. The highways travel concurrently to Colome.
  east-southeast of Fairfax. The highways travel concurrently to south of Armour.
  east of Menno
  south-southwest of Worthing.
Iowa
  in Lincoln Township. The highways travel concurrently through the township.
  in Sanborn. The highways travel concurrently to Franklin Township.
  in Spencer. The highways travel concurrently through the city.
  in Algona
  in Garfield Township. The highways travel concurrently to Garner.
  in Clear Lake. The highways travel concurrently to Lake Township.
  in Mason City
  in Floyd. The highways travel concurrently to Charles City.
  in New Hampton. The highways travel concurrently to Dresden Township.
  in Post Township. The highways travel concurrently to Giard Township.
Wisconsin
  in Fennimore. The highways travel concurrently through the city.
  east of Dodgeville. The highways travel concurrently to Madison.
  in Madison. US 12/US 18 travel concurrently to Cambridge. US 14/US 18 travel concurrently through Madison.
  in Madison
  in Madison
  northeast of Waukesha
  in Wauwatosa.
 Michigan Street/Lincoln Memorial Drive in Milwaukee

See also

Special routes
U.S. Route 18 Bypass in Hot Springs, South Dakota
U.S. Route 18 Business in Mason City, Iowa
U.S. Route 18 Business in Marquette and McGregor, Iowa

Related U.S. Routes
U.S. Route 118 (former)
U.S. Route 218 runs north and south. The parent and child meet in Charles City, Iowa.

References

External links

 Endpoints of U.S. Highway 18

 
United States Numbered Highway System
U.S. Highways in South Dakota
U.S. Highways in Wyoming